William Openshaw (1881–1945) was an English professional footballer who played as a full-back.

References

1881 births
1945 deaths
Footballers from Manchester
English footballers
Association football fullbacks
Openshaw Clarence F.C. players
Hooley Hill F.C. players
Grimsby Town F.C. players
Salford United F.C. players
Rochdale A.F.C. players
Macclesfield Town F.C. players
Ashton United F.C. players
Eccles United F.C. players
English Football League players